The Association of Translation Companies (ATC) is a professional membership association promoting language services in the United Kingdom and beyond. The ATC represents the interests of translation companies operating in the UK's expanding language services industry which is home to over 1,200 translation companies, is worth more than £1 billion and employs more than 12,000 people.

The ATC's stated vision is to create recognition and trust for stakeholders by promoting and regulating quality-driven language industry standards and best practice, and to support and nurture its members for sustainability and growth.

Organisation 
The Association of Translation Companies Ltd is governed by a volunteer Council elected from ATC member companies. The association's direction is set by the Council, led by its elected Officers: Chair, Vice Chair and Treasurer. Responsible for implementing the council's vision and strategy is the ATC's Chief Executive Officer who heads the association's activities supported by its Secretariat.

In addition to convening a minimum of four times a year, Council members actively participate in the association's committees and lead its projects.

A previous chair, for 9 years, and still an active Council member is multi-award-winning serial entrepreneur Roy Allkin, the owner of the Wolfestone Group of companies and Boss Brewing Company.

Objectives 
The ATC's promotes quality-driven professional language services for the benefit of its member companies. The association's activities serve the needs of the people, businesses and public-sector organisations commissioning translation, interpreting and other language services.

The Association provides specific information to translation buyers about members’ specialities; speaks with authority to Government on matters concerning the profession; provides information and assistance to business, industry and members of the public who wish to use the services of a language service provider.

Its objectives are to:

 Promote the interests and use of ATC member companies;
 Promote and further the interests of the translating profession generally;
 Promote, publish and enforce a Code of Professional Conduct for its members;
 Arbitrate in matters concerning members and clients;
 Establish, maintain and promote the adoption of rigorous quality systems by its members;
 Ensure that the interests of those purchasing translations are protected by ensuring that its members carry full professional indemnity insurance;
 Promote co-operation among members and others within the translation profession;
 Publish information about the translation profession and matters of interest to translation purchasers;
 Promote greater use of professionally produced translations by those seeking to sell and communicate worldwide.

History 
The Association of Translation Companies was formed in 1976 by leading British translation companies keen to promote the use of professionally produced, high quality, translation work by professional translation companies, to support the UK's exporters.

Since its inception, the ATC has played a pivotal role in the development of European language services. It was the driving force behind the establishment of the European Union of Associations of Translation Companies, and one of the original developers of the European translation services standard EN 15038, a precursor to the international translation services standard ISO 17100.

Membership

Full Member 
Membership is available to established companies able to provide full accounts of the previous three trading years. A minimum of 65% of the company's core business must be the provision of translation services.

Supported Start-up 
Membership of the ATC as a Supported Start-up is available to start-up Language Service Provider businesses that have been trading for over six months who are able to provide the supporting documents in the ATC's Eligibility and Criteria section.

Corporate Partner 
Membership is available to translation departments within companies whose core business may be in any sector.

Accredited Partner 
Accredited Partner status is available to those companies who are stakeholders in the translation industry, for example office furniture suppliers.

Technology Partner 
Technology Partner status is available to those companies supplying hardware or software specifically tailored to the translation business.

Activities 
The ATC organises regular networking and training events and webinars, and hosts an annual conference, the Language Industry Summit. The association publishes an annual Language Industry Survey, in collaboration with market research firm Nimdzi Insights, charting the state of the language services industry in the UK.

The ATC speaks with authority on the economic case of languages for the future of the UK's international trade and exporting and supports several research activities and government lobbying initiatives.

ATC Certification Stamp 
Full ATC member companies have the use of the ATC Certification Stamp, which maybe be used to certify official translations such as certificates. The stamp carries the member's name, membership number, the current year, and the stamp line “The mark of quality-managed translation service”.

ATC ISO Certification Service 
The ATC's commercial ISO Certification Service provides auditing and certification services and training on language service and quality management ISO standards to ATC members and translation companies worldwide.

See also 
 List of UK interpreting and translation associations
 List of professional associations in the United Kingdom
 Association of Language Companies (US equivalent)

References

External links 
 Homepage



Translation associations of the United Kingdom
Lists of organisations based in the United Kingdom
Translation Companies
Language interpretation